Alex Dowdalls (born 30 January 1960) is a Scottish cricket umpire. He stood in matches during the 2016 ICC World Cricket League Division Five tournament in Jersey.

On 15 January 2017 he stood in his first Twenty20 International (T20I) match, between Oman and the Netherlands in the 2017 Desert T20 Challenge. He stood in his first One Day International (ODI) match between the United Arab Emirates and Hong Kong on 26 January 2017.

In April 2019, he was named as one of the eight on-field umpires for the 2019 ICC World Cricket League Division Two tournament in Namibia.

In August 2019, during the 2019 Scotland Tri-Nation Series, Dowdalls umpired in his 250th international match, the most by any Scottish umpire.

See also
 List of One Day International cricket umpires
 List of Twenty20 International cricket umpires

References

External links
 

1960 births
Living people
Scottish cricket umpires
Scottish One Day International cricket umpires
Scottish Twenty20 International cricket umpires
Place of birth missing (living people)